Medical Information Technology, Inc., shortened to Meditech, is a privately held Massachusetts-based software and service company that develops and sells information systems for health care organizations.

History
In 1969, Neil Pappalardo began development of the programming language MIIS. This was one of several proprietary implementations of MUMPS, a programming language which at the time had not been standardized. In July that year, Pappalardo and Morton E. Ruderman, Curtis W. Marble, Jerome H. Grossman and Edward B. Roberts founded the company, with a $500,000 investment from EG&G. MIIS users and developers later influenced efforts toward MUMPS standardization during the early 1970s; the MUMPS standard was complete by 1974 and approved by 1977. Between 1971 and 1979, Pappalardo developed various other systems, but those associated with integrated health care information remained his primary focus.

In 1982, Meditech adopted the then-new MAGIC programming language for its health care information systems. In 1994, the company adopted client/server, a second software platform. While client/server utilized the same programming language, MAGIC runs all code on a central server, and clients are in effect dumb terminals. Client/server executes the code on a user's PC, although all code remained centralized. Client-server supports only Microsoft Windows-based operating systems.  Meditech announced its version 6.0 in 2006.

In 2003, Howard Messing was named president, and in 2010 also became chief executive officer.

MEDITECH announced the launch of Expanse, the company’s mobile, web-based EHR, on February 27, 2018.

On January 29, 2020, Meditech announced the launch of Expanse Patient Care, a web-based application software that allows nurses and therapists to conduct administrative tasks through a mobile device.

In 2021, Michelle O’Connor was named president and chief executive officer.

Markets
Meditech expanded from the United States and Canada into the United Kingdom, South Africa, Australia, and several other communities, including the Spanish-speaking world.

Products and services

Meditech offers software for health care organizations of various types and sizes.  Some of the software modules include: Health Information Management, Revenue Cycle, Scanning and Archiving, Scheduling and Referral Management, as well as others.

Partnerships
Meditech South Africa, founded in 1982, provides software and services to the health care industry in Africa and the Middle East. On June 6, 2012, Meditech announced its partnership with Intelligent Medical Objects to provide mapping of clinician-friendly diagnosis and procedure terminologies to billing codes and medical concepts.

Locations
Meditech owns several facilities in eastern Massachusetts, located in Westwood, Canton, Fall River, and Foxborough. Meditech also has a facility in Atlanta, Georgia that was the former offices of Patient Care Technologies (PtCT), which is chiefly responsible for the company's Home Care line of clinical and billing software. Meditech also owns a building in Minnetonka, Minnesota along with global offices in the United Kingdom, South Africa, Australia, and Singapore.

References

Health care companies based in Massachusetts
Health care companies established in 1969
Software companies based in Massachusetts
Software companies established in 1969
Privately held companies based in Massachusetts
MUMPS programming language family
Health information technology companies
1969 establishments in Massachusetts
American companies established in 1969
Software companies of the United States